is a train station in Katsuragi, Nara Prefecture, Japan.

Lines
Kintetsu
Gose Line

Layout
The station has two side platforms and two tracks.

Adjacent stations

Railway stations in Japan opened in 1930
Railway stations in Nara Prefecture